Philip Brennan (born 30 July 1983 in Tulla, County Clare) is an Irish sportsperson. He plays hurling with his local club Tulla and has been the goalkeeper on the Clare senior inter-county team since 2007. He works as a Hurley Maker for John Torpey Woodturning Ltd.

References

1983 births
Living people
Tulla (Clare) hurlers
Clare inter-county hurlers
Hurling goalkeepers